Hunminjeongeum is a document describing an entirely new and native script for the Korean language. The script was initially named after the publication but later came to be known as hangul. Originally containing 28 characters, it was created so that the common people illiterate in hanja (Chinese characters) could accurately and easily read and write the Korean language. Four letters among the 28 were discarded over time. The original spelling of the title was 훈〮민져ᇰ〮ᅙᅳᆷ Húnminjyéongeum (in North Korean version Húnminjyéonghʼeum). 

The Hunminjeongeum was announced in Volume 102 of the Annals of King Sejong, and its formal supposed publication date, October 9, 1446, is now Hangul Day in South Korea. The Annals place its invention to the 25th year of Sejong's reign, corresponding to 1443–1444. UNESCO included the 1446 manuscript publishing the Hunminjeongeum in the Memory of the World Programme.

History
Before Hangul, the Korean alphabet, was created, Koreans used Chinese characters to record their words. Since Chinese language and Korean language share few similarities, borrowing Chinese characters proved to be inefficient to reflect the spoken language. In addition, at the time when King Sejong was inventing Hangul the Ming Dynasty had just come to power in China, which changed the pronunciation of Chinese characters, making it harder for Koreans to learn the new standard pronunciation to record their words. The illiteracy level also stayed high since reading and learning Chinese characters was restricted among the ordinary people. They were generally used in official documents by the ruling class. The ruling class took advantage of this and learning the Chinese characters became a symbol of power and privilege. In order to make written language more accessible for common people, King Sejong started creating Hangul secretly, since the ruling class would be appalled by the news. 

Hangul was personally created by Sejong the Great, the fourth king of the Joseon dynasty, and revealed by him in 1443. Although it is widely assumed that King Sejong ordered the Hall of Worthies to invent Hangul, contemporary records such as the Veritable Records of King Sejong and Jeong Inji's preface to the Hunminjeongeum Haerye emphasize that he invented it himself. This is stated in Book 113 of The Annals of King Sejong (Sejongsillok) on the 9th month and the 28th year of reign of King Sejong and at the end of An Illustrated Explanation of Hunminjeongeum (Hunminjeongeum Haeryebon). Afterward, King Sejong wrote the preface to the Hunminjeongeum, explaining the origin and purpose of Hangul and providing brief examples and explanations, and then tasked the Hall of Worthies to write detailed examples and explanations. The head of the Hall of Worthies, Jeong In-ji, was responsible for compiling the Hunminjeongeum. The Hunminjeongeum was published and promulgated to the public in 1446. The writing system is referred to as “Hangul” today but was originally named as Hunminjeongeum by King Sejong. “Hunmin” and “Jeongeum” are respective words that each indicate “to teach the people” and “proper sounds.” Together Hunminjeongeum means “correct sounds for the instruction of the people”

Content
The publication is written in Classical Chinese and contains a preface, the alphabet letters (jamo), and brief descriptions of their corresponding sounds. It is later supplemented by a longer document called Hunminjeongeum Haerye that is designated as a national treasure No. 70. To distinguish it from its supplement, Hunminjeongeum is sometimes called the "Samples and Significance Edition of Hunminjeongeum".

The Classical Chinese (漢文/hanmun) of the Hunminjeongeum has been partly translated into Middle Korean. This translation is found together with Worinseokbo, and is called the Hunminjeongeum Eonhaebon.

The first paragraph of the document reveals King Sejong's motivation for creating hangul:
Classical Chinese (Original):

Transliteration:
1. Kúik jig yěeog ʼeum.
2. Ōíg hhog dyung kúik.
3. Ōyěog mun jjáwg búlʼ syang lyuw tong.
4. Kóg yeug min yěuw sǒg ōyók yeeon.
5. Zig jyung búlʼ déuk sin kkeuig jjyeong jyǎg dag yěeuig.
6. Ōyeog ōúig chǎwg mǐn zyeon.
7. Sin jyéoig zíg ssíb bálʼ jjáwg.
8. Ōyók sǎwg zin zin ōíg ssíb bbyeon ʼeog zílʼ ōyóng zǐg.
Mix of hanja (Chinese characters) and Hangul (Eonhaebon):
 
Transliteration:
1. Kúik jig yěeog ʼeum ōí.
2. Ōíg hhog dyung kúik háw ōyá.
3. Ōyěog mun jjáwg ló búlʼ syang lyuw tong hawl ssáwi.
4. Kóg ló yeug min ōí yěuw sǒg ōyók yeeon háw ōya dó.
5. Zig jyung búlʼ déuk sin kkeuig jjyeong jyǎg i dag yěeuig lá.
6. Ōyeog i ōúig chǎwg mǐn zyeon háw ōyá.
7. Sin jyéoig zíg ssíb bálʼ jjáwg háw no ní.
8. Ōyók sǎwg zin zin ōáw ló ōíg ssíb háw ōyá bbyeon ʼeog zílʼ ōyóng zǐg ni lá.
Rendered into written Korean (Eonhaebon):
 
Transliteration:
1. Ni lás mǎl ssaw mí.
2. Dyung kúik ōéoi dal ōá.
3. Mun jjáwg ōóa ló seo leu saw maws dí ōa ní hawl ssáwi.
4. Ōí leon jyeon cháw ló ōeo lín báwik syéong ōí ni leu kó jyéo hólʼ bái ōi syéo dó.
5. Maw cháwm nǎi jeoi bdéu déul si léo pyeo dí mǒd hawlʼ nó mí ha ní lá.
6. Nái ōí láwl ōúig háw ōyá ōěo ōyeos bí neo kyéo.
7. Sái ló séu méul ōyeo déulb jjáwg láwl mawing káw no ní.
8. Sǎ lawm mǎ dá hǎwi hngwyéo sǔ ví ni kyéo nál ló bsú méoi bbyeon ʼan khéui haw kó jyéo hawlʼ sdaw law mí ni lá.

Translation:

Versions

The manuscript of the original Hunminjeongeum has two versions:
 Seven pages written in Classical Chinese, except where the Hangul letters are mentioned, as can be seen in the image at the top of this article. Three copies are left:
 The one found at the beginning of the Haerye copy
 The one included in Sejongsillok (세종실록; 世宗實錄; "The Sejong Chronicles"), Volume 113.
 The Eonhaebon, 36 pages, extensively annotated in hangul, with all hanja transcribed with small hangul to their lower right. The Hangul were written in both ink-brush and geometric styles. Four copies are left:
 At the beginning of Worinseokbo (월인석보; 月印釋譜), an annotated Buddhist scripture
 One preserved by Park Seungbin
 One preserved by Kanazawa, a Japanese person
 One preserved by Japanese Imperial Household Agency

References

External links 

 Scanned copy of the Eonhae
 UNESCO provides the photos of the book

1446 books
15th century in Korea
1446 in Asia
Hangul
Joseon dynasty works
National Treasures of South Korea
Manuscripts
Memory of the World Register